André Santini (born 20 October 1940) is a French politician and current mayor of Issy-les-Moulineaux, Hauts-de-Seine.

A former member of the UDF, he did not support François Bayrou, the candidate of his party for the first round of the 2007 French presidential election, choosing instead to support Nicolas Sarkozy of the Union for a Popular Movement. After the election, he joined the new right-of-center party known as the New Centre (with other former UDF members who supported Nicolas Sarkozy) in the National Assembly, where he had been re-elected during the June 2007 elections.

He was nominated as Secretary of State for the Civil Service by François Fillon in June 2007. Fillon thus broke with the misnamed "Balladur jurisprudence" according to which an indicted minister was to resign from his ministerial functions. Santini had been indicted, along with Charles Pasqua, for corruption concerning the creation of the art foundation Hamon.

Santini's indictment in the Fondation Hamon affair was confirmed in September 2007 and in February 2008. He was acquitted on appeal on 23 September 2015 by the Versailles Court of Appeals.

He speaks fluent English.

Political career

Governmental functions

Secretary of State for Public Service: 2007–2009.

Secretary of State for Consumer Affairs: 1987–1988.
 
Secretary of State for Returnees: 1986–1987.

Electoral mandates

National Assembly of France

Vice-president of the National Assembly of France: 1997–1998

Member of the National Assembly of France for Hauts-de-Seine: 1988–2001 (Resignation) / 2002–2007 (Became Secretary of State in 2007) / And since 2009. Elected in 1988, reelected in 1993, 1997, 2002, 2007, 2012.

General Council

Vice-president of the General council of Hauts-de-Seine: 2001–2002 (Resignation).

General councillor of Hauts-de-Seine: 2001–2002 (Resignation).

Municipal Council

Mayor of Issy-les-Moulineaux: Since 1980. Reelected in 1983, 1989, 1995, 2001, 2008.

Municipal councillor of Issy-les-Moulineaux: Since 1980. Reelected in 1983, 1989, 1995, 2001, 2008.

Deputy-mayor of Courbevoie: 1971–1977

Municipal councillor of Courbevoie: 1971–1977

Agglomeration community Council

President of the Agglomeration community of Arc de Seine: Since 2004. Reelected in 2008.

Member of the Agglomeration community of Arc de Seine: Since 2004. Reelected in 2008.

References 

1940 births
Living people
Politicians from Paris
French people of Corsican descent
Union for French Democracy politicians
Social Democratic Party (France) politicians
The Centrists politicians
Democratic European Force politicians
French Ministers of Civil Service
Lycée Pasteur (Neuilly-sur-Seine) alumni
Sciences Po alumni
Deputies of the 12th National Assembly of the French Fifth Republic
Deputies of the 13th National Assembly of the French Fifth Republic
Deputies of the 14th National Assembly of the French Fifth Republic
Union of Democrats and Independents politicians
Mayors of places in Île-de-France